Marcel Lenz is the name of:

Marcel Lenz (footballer, born 1987), German football player
Marcel Lenz (footballer, born 1991), German football player